"Homunculus et la Belle Etoile" is a poem from Wallace Stevens's first book of poetry, Harmonium. It was first published in 1919.

Interpretation

The poem pursues a contrast between poetic imagination and philosophical reasoning, the latter understood as abstract system-building associated with the rationalist tradition going back to Plato. Stevens implicitly contrasts the philosophers' Plato with 'the ultimate Plato'. Both seek the supreme good, but Plato and the other philosophers look for it in something abstract like Plato's 'Forms'—a gaunt fugitive phantom. The poet finds the highest good in the sensuous lived experience of an evening in Biscayne, where the good light of Venus, the Evening Star, reveals it to the poet as wanton, abundantly beautiful, eager, fecund. (For comparison see "On the Manner of Addressing Clouds" and "Six Significant Landscapes".)

Notes

References 

 Buttel, Robert. William Stevens: The Making of Harmonium. Princeton University Press, 1967.

1919 poems
American poems
Poetry by Wallace Stevens